Matthew Robbins (born 8 May 1977) is a former Australian rules footballer who played with both Geelong and the Western Bulldogs in the AFL.

Recruited to the Geelong Football Club with pick 36 in the 1994 AFL Draft, Robbins played only 7 games in his 3 seasons at the Cats, being traded to the Western Bulldogs for the 1998 season. 

He became a solid small forward option for the Bulldogs, and in 2005 took a one handed mark against the Brisbane Lions in Round 18 which was one of the spectacular highlights of his season. Robbins finished with 31 goals from 16 games in 2005.

Robbins kicked 45 goals in 2006 as a small forward, and in 2007 fell out of favour with the coaching staff and managed only a handful of senior games.  By falling out of form and out of favour with the coaching staff Robbins was compelled to announce his retirement following the end of the 2007 season. He kicked three goals in his last game against the Kangaroos, in which was also Luke Darcy's last game.  At the conclusion of the match, both Robbins and Darcy were chaired from the ground and given a guard of honour from both teams.  

Robbins attended Salesian College.

Robbins has expressed his wish to continue playing football in 2008, quoting that he would like to play in the VFL, or play amateur football with his brothers at Ormond.

References

External links
 
 

Western Bulldogs players
Robbins, Matthews
Living people
Geelong Football Club players
Australian rules footballers from Victoria (Australia)
Werribee Football Club players
Sandringham Dragons players
Ormond Amateur Football Club players
People educated at Salesian College (Chadstone)